Guang R. Gao (1945 – 12 September 2021) was a computer scientist and a Professor of Electrical and Computer Engineering at the University of Delaware.  Gao was a founder and Chief Scientist of ETI (ET International Inc., Newark, Delaware).

Education and early life 
Born in Tianjin in 1945 and brought up in a prominent physician family in China, Gao has received a strict education from early childhood both in traditional knowledge of Chinese history and culture, as well as in western science and English.  Gao has shown his strong interests and curiosity in science subjects, and received his education in the elite Tsinghua University in Beijing.  In January 1980,  Gao has left China and pursued his graduate education in the United States.  He received his master's degree and PhD degree in 1982 and 1986 respectively both in Computer Science at Massachusetts Institute of Technology (MIT).  Gao is the first person from mainland China who received a Computer Science Ph.D. degree from MIT.

Career and legacy 
Gao has begun his research career in the west as a junior faculty member at McGill University in 1987—at a time that the computer science community has a widespread doubt on the future of parallel computing  in general and dataflow model of parallel computation in particular.

Gao has devoted a majority of his research and academic careers in carrying on the legacy of the MIT dataflow model research that he has participated in, and contributed to, during his Ph.D.  project under  Prof. Jack. B. Dennis and Arvind.  The legacy of Gao's own research is to show that the fundamental value of the dataflow model  of computation can be effectively explored and efficiently realized – and the superiority dataflow can be demonstrated even in parallel computer systems that are made of classical microprocessors with von-Neumann architectures and other components.  To this end, Gao has led a series of parallel architecture and system projects where various aspects of dataflow models are improved and integrated in the design and implementation – ranging from innovations in programming paradigms, architecture features, system software technology,  including novel program optimization and runtime system techniques.  Gao's contribution was recognized by receiving the ACM Fellow and IEEE Fellow in 2007.

Gao's research focused in dataflow models, parallel computing, computer system architecture, program analysis and optimization techniques.

Dataflow models for computation and refinement and extension
Multithreaded programming/execution models inspired by dataflow
Computer system architecture
Compiler optimization models and techniques and inspired by dataflow
Software pipelining
Program analysis techniques

The legacy of Gao's work  has also been associated with his entrepreneurial effort to initiate the technology transfer and commercialization  of the dataflow R&D results for real world applications through ETI (ET International Inc.). ETI is a company started in 2000 as a University of Delaware spinoff  with Gao as its co-founder.  A unique achievement of Gao's team at ETI is its critical role in the now legendary supercomputing system project known as IBM Cyclops-64 Supercomputer. The success of the TNT on Cyclops64 supercomputer is recognized by the selection of ETI as winner of  a Supercomputing disruptive technology award in 2007. ET International, Inc was highlighted for "Sparking Economic Growth" by The Science Coalition in 2013.

Through 30+ years persistent R&D and entrepreneurial effort – Gao and his students propelled the impact of MIT dataflow model of computation beyond their laboratory in  the US to other parts of the world including EU and Asia.

Awards and recognitions 

 IEEE Computer Society Bob Rau Award: Awarded for significant contributions in the field of computer microarchitecture and compiler code generation during the 50th edition of MICRO held in Boston.
 Gauss Award: Awarded during the International Supercomputing Conference 2011 held in Hamburg, Germany for the paper "Experiments with the Fresh Breeze Tree-Based Memory Model", co-authored with Jack Dennis from MIT and Xiaoxuan Meng from the University of Delaware.
 IEEE Fellow, 2008: Awarded for his contributions in Parallel Computer Architectures and Compilers.
 ACM Fellow, 2007: Awarded for his contributions in Multiprocessor Computers and Compiler Optimization Techniques.
 China Computer Federation (CCF) Overseas Outstanding Achievement Award.

References

External links 

 Guang R. Gao Home Page
 CAPSL Team
 Congressman Carney tours UD spin-off focused on supercomputing

1945 births
2021 deaths
Scientists from Tianjin
American computer scientists
American electrical engineers
Chinese emigrants to the United States
Chinese computer scientists
Chinese electrical engineers
Fellow Members of the IEEE
Fellows of the Association for Computing Machinery
Tsinghua University alumni
Huazhong University of Science and Technology alumni
MIT School of Engineering alumni
University of Delaware faculty
Academic staff of McGill University